The UK Albums Chart is one of many music charts compiled by the Official Charts Company that calculates the best-selling albums of the week in the United Kingdom. Before 2004, the chart was only based on the sales of physical albums. This list shows albums that peaked in the top 10 of the UK Albums Chart during 1962, as well as albums which peaked in 1961 and 1963 but were in the top 10 in 1962. The entry date is when the album appeared in the top ten for the first time (week ending, as published by the Official Charts Company, which is six days after the chart is announced).

Thirty-nine albums were in the top ten this year. One album from 1958, two from 1960 and ten albums from 1961 remained in the top 10 for several weeks at the beginning of the year, while Bobby Vee Meets the Crickets by Bobby Vee and The Crickets, and Rock 'N' Roll No. 2 by Elvis Presley were both released in 1962 but did not reach their peak until 1963. The Best of Barber and Bilk Volume 2 by Chris Barber and Acker Bilk, The Black and White Minstrel Show by The George Mitchell Minstrels, Blue Hawaii by Elvis Presley, Ring-a-Ding-Ding! by Frank Sinatra and The Young Ones by Cliff Richard were the albums from 1961 to reach their peak in 1962. Ten artists scored multiple entries in the top 10 in 1962. Bobby Vee, Karl Denver, Kenny Ball, Ray Charles and The Temperance Seven were among the many artists who achieved their first UK charting top 10 album in 1962.

The first number-one album of the year was Blue Hawaii by Elvis Presley. Overall, eight different albums peaked at number-one in 1962, with Elvis Presley (2) having the most albums hit that position.

Background

Multiple entries
Thirty-nine albums charted in the top 10 in 1962, with twenty-nine albums reaching their peak this year (including The Buddy Holly Story, The King and I and West Side Story, which charted in previous years but reached a peak on their latest chart run).

Ten artists scored multiple entries in the top 10 in 1962. Acker Bilk secured four top-ten albums, Chris Barber, Elvis Presley, Frank Sinatra, The George Mitchell Minstrels and The Shadows all had three top ten entries, while Bobby Vee, Cliff Richard, The Crickets and Dorothy Provine were the acts who had two top 10 albums this year.

Chart debuts
Ten artists achieved their first top 10 album in 1962 as a lead artist: The Bruvvers, George Shearing, Helen Shapiro, Joe Brown, Karl Denver, Kenny Ball, Norrie Paramor, Ray Charles and The Temperance Seven; Bobby Vee had one more entry in his breakthrough year.

The following table (collapsed on desktop site) does not include acts who had previously charted as part of a group and secured their first top 10 solo album, or featured appearances on compilations or other artists recordings.

Soundtracks
Cast recordings from various films and musicals made the top five this year. These included Blitz!, It's Trad, Dad!, The King and I and West Side Story.

Top-ten albums
Key

Entries by artist
The following table shows artists who achieved two or more top 10 entries in 1962, including albums that reached their peak between 1959 and 1961, or 1963. The figures only include main artists, with featured artists and appearances on compilation albums not counted individually for each artist. The total number of weeks an artist spent in the top ten in 1962 is also shown.

Notes

 Bobby Vee Meets the Crickets reached its peak of number two on 12 January 1963 (week ending).
 South Pacific: Original Soundtrack re-entered the top 10 at number 9 on 24 November 1962 (week ending) for 21 weeks, at number 10 on 27 April 1963 (week ending) for 5 weeks, at number 10 on 15 June 1963 (week ending), at number 9 on 29 June 1963 (week ending) for 6 weeks, at number 10 on 21 December 1963 (week ending), at number 10 on 4 January 1964 (week ending) for 3 weeks, at number 10 on 8 February 1964 (week ending), at number 10 on 21 March 1964 (week ending) for 2 weeks, at number 8 on 11 April 1964 (week ending) for 2 weeks and at number 9 on 9 May 1964 (week ending).
 The Buddy Holly Story originally peaked at number two upon its initial release in 1959. It re-entered the top 10 at number 10 on 24 March 1962 (week ending) and at number 10 on 23 February 1963 (week ending).
 Oliver! re-entered the top 10 at number 6 on 10 February 1962 (week ending) for three weeks and at number 10 on 2 June 1962 (week ending).
 The Best of Barber and Bilk Volume 1 re-entered the top 10 at number 7 on 3 February 1962 (week ending).
 The Sound of Music re-entered the top 10 at number 7 on 21 April 1962 (week ending) for two weeks, at number 7 on 12 May 1962 (week ending) for three weeks, at number 8 on 9 June 1962 (week ending) and at number 10 on 22 September 1962 (week ending).
 The Shadows re-entered the top 10 at number 6 on 13 January 1962 (week ending) for 17 weeks, at number 8 on 19 May 1962 (week ending) for two weeks, at number 10 on 9 June 1962 (week ending) for six weeks and at number 9 on 28 July 1962 (week ending) for eleven weeks.
 Another Black and White Minstrel Show re-entered the top 10 at number 9 on 22 December 1962 (week ending) for three weeks.
 Something for Everybody re-entered the top 10 at number 10 on 13 January 1962 (week ending) and at number 10 on 27 January 1962 (week ending).
 Wimoweh re-entered the top 10 at number 8 on 17 February 1962 (week ending), at number 9 on 3 March 1962 (week ending) for three weeks, at number 7 on 7 April 1962 (week ending) for three weeks, at number 9 on 5 May 1962 (week ending) for two weeks and at number 9 on 2 June 1962 (week ending).
 The King and I: Original Soundtrack originally peaked at number-one upon its initial release in 1956. 
 Vamp from The Roaring 20's re-entered the top 10 at number 10 on 10 March 1962 (week ending).
 West Side Story originally peaked at number 6 upon its initial release in 1959.
 It's Trad, Dad!: Original Soundtrack re-entered the top 10 at number 10 on 25 August 1962 (week ending) for two weeks.
 Pot Luck re-entered the top 10 at number 10 on 8 December 1962 (week ending).
 Twistin' and Twangin re-entered the top 10 at number 10 on 29 September 1962 (week ending).
 The Best of Barber, Ball and Bilk re-entered the top 10 at number 8 on 29 December 1962 (week ending).
 A Golden Age of Donegan re-entered the top 10 at number 9 on 12 January 1963 (week ending) for two weeks.
 A Picture of You re-entered the top 10 at number 9 on 19 January 1963 (week ending) for two weeks.
 32 Minutes and 17 Seconds with Cliff Richard re-entered the top 10 at number 10 on 5 January 1963 (week ending) for four weeks.
 Rock 'N' Roll No. 2 originally peaked at number 3 upon its initial release in 1957. It was re-issued by RCA Victor in 1962 and re-appeared in the expanded top 10 from 15 December 1962 (week ending) for fourteen weeks, including a second week at its peak of number 3 on 26 January 1963 (week ending). This gave it a total of 17 weeks in the top 10 overall.
 Figure includes album that peaked in 1961.
 Figure includes album that first charted in 1961 but peaked in 1962.
 Figure includes album that peaked in 1963.
 Figure includes album that peaked in 1960.
 Figure includes album that peaked in 1959.

See also
1962 in British music
List of number-one albums from the 1960s (UK)

References
General

Specific

External links
1962 album chart archive at the Official Charts Company (click on relevant week)

United Kingdom top 10 albums
Top 10 albums
1962